The Links at Monck's Landing Golf Club is a public golf course located in Norland, Ontario, Canada that opened for play in 2008.

History
The  parcel of land upon which Monck's Landing is situated was homesteaded by Edward Stephens in 1859. Three generations of the Stephens family maintained a working farm on the site until 1961. The farm was considered quite prosperous for the area, being located on a pocket of rich topsoil rarely seen in the region. The property changed hands several times after 1961, until 2009 when it was turned into a golf course.
In October 2014, the course went bankrupt. In June 2015 the links was purchased and now the current owners have taken care of and continue to operate The Links at Monck's Landing Golf Club.

The name
The Links at Monck's Landing Golf Club derives its name from the proximity of present-day City of Kawartha Lakes County Road 45, which began its existence as The Monck Road, a former colonization route extending from Lake Couchiching in the west to its eastern terminus in Bancroft. The Monck Road was named after Lord Charles Stanley Monck, the first Governor General of Canada, and was completed in 1873. Monck's Landing is located three kilometres north of the former Monck Road.

Course description
Monck's Landing is a 9-hole course that plays to a par of 35. Currently it measures 3,081 yards from the Blue tees, 2,859 yards from the White tees, and 2,486 yards from the Gold tees. A dual tee block system allows those golfers wishing to play 18 holes a "back 9" that presents a layout both differing and distinct from that experienced the first time around. Monck's Landing bills itself as a links-style layout that utilizes the property's rolling (60-foot change in elevation), treeless terrain, and such features as deep pot bunkers and high fescue rough, to approximate the experience of playing golf on the classic courses of the British Isles. The course has gained the reputation as a challenging layout, having been described as "testing" and "tough as nails" by various golf writers. Monck's Landing has been compared favourably to other inland links courses in Ontario such as Tarandowah in recent golf publications. The Links at Monck's Landing Golf Club was awarded a nomination for "Best New Course in Ontario" by Fairways Magazine in May, 2010, as well being included on columnist Robert Thompson's list of his favourite Canadian "links" and featured in Ontario Golf Magazine's Mid Summer 2010 article "Best Bang For The Buck - There's great golf to be across Ontario for $65 or less". The course also received a favourable review in the Fall 2011 issue of SCOREGolf Magazine, in which it was described as "an affordable and gnarly nine-hole links course with plenty of bite."

The Stone Barn
Situated prominently upon the property is a unique stone barn that is intended to house Monck's Landing's clubhouse in the near future. Built in 1919, with  stone walls that extend up to its rafters, this stone barn is considered by some experts to be the only structure of its kind in Ontario.

Scorecard

Photo gallery

References

External links
 Monck's Landing Website
 Course Review: The Links at Monck's Landing by Robert Thompson, Sept. 29, 2009
 A Remarkable Stone Barn, Minden Times, Sept. 30, 2009
 Golf Drives On Even In These Rough Times, Toronto Star, July 25, 2009
 British Open Week: Canadian Links by Robert Thompson, July 12, 1010
 Best Bang For The Buck - There's great golf to be across Ontario for $65 or less, Ontario Golf Magazine, Mid Summer 2010 Issue
 Cottage Country Links, SCOREGolf Magazine, Fall 2011 Issue
 The Land Between Website
 City Of Kawartha Lakes Website

Golf clubs and courses in Ontario